Hyderabad District may refer to:

Hyderabad district, India
Hyderabad District, Sindh, Pakistan

District name disambiguation pages